WTNN (97.5 FM) is a commercial radio station licensed to Bristol, Vermont, and serving the Burlington-Plattsburgh-Champlain Valley radio market.  It is owned by Impact Radio and broadcasts a country music radio format, calling itself "Eagle Country 97.5."

The radio studios and offices are on Williston Road in South Burlington.  The transmitter is on Brownell Road in Williston.  WTNN has an effective radiated power (ERP) of 8,700 watts.

Programming
Weekdays begin with the Big D and Bubba morning show, syndicated from Compass Media Networks.  The rest of the weekday schedule features local DJs.  On weekends, the Top 30 Countdown with Bobby Bones is heard from Premiere Networks.  Eagle 97.5 competes for country music listeners primarily with 98.9 WOKO owned by Hall Communications.  Brian Ram serves as WTNN's program director.

History

References

External links

TNN
Country radio stations in the United States
Radio stations established in 2007
2007 establishments in Vermont